Mavia (Māwiyya; also transliterated Mawia, Mawai, or Mawaiy, and sometimes referred to as Mania or Mavia of Tanukh) was an Arab warrior-queen, who ruled over the Tanukhids, a confederation of semi-nomadic Arabs, in southern Syria, in the latter half of the fourth century. She led her troops in a rebellion against late Roman rule, riding at the head of her army into Phoenicia and Palestine. After she reached the frontiers of Egypt and repeatedly defeated the Roman army, the Romans finally made a truce with her on conditions she stipulated. The Romans later called upon her for assistance when being attacked by the Goths, to which she responded by sending a force of cavalry.

Considered to be "the most powerful woman in the late antique Arabia after Zenobia" much of what is known about Mavia comes from early, almost contemporaneous accounts, such as the writings of Rufinus, thought to be derived from a now lost account by Gelasius of Caeserea. Later authors transformed her into a Christian of Roman stock, though she was evidently Arab, and perhaps initially pagan.

Biography
The ancestors of Mavia, whose Arabic name was Mawiyya, were Tanukhids, a loose affiliation of Arab tribes that migrated northwards from the Arabian Peninsula a century before Mavia was born, because of growing Sasanian influence in Eastern Arabia. Mavia's husband was al-Hawari, the last king of the semi-nomadic Tanukh confederation in southern Syria in the latter half of the fourth century. When he died in 375 CE without leaving an heir, Mavia rose to command the confederation in a revolt against Roman rule that extended throughout the Levant.

The reasons for the revolt are thought to have been religious. After al-Hawari's death, the Roman emperor Valens, an Arian heterodox, decided to disregard the requests of the Arabs for an orthodox bishop, insisting on the appointment of an Arian bishop instead. Mavia withdrew from Aleppo into the desert with her people, forming alliances with desert Arabs and gaining support throughout much of Arabia and Syria, in preparation for the fight against Roman rule. It is unclear as to whether Mavia herself was Christian at this time or not. Some historians report that it was during her military exploits that she met an ascetic monk who so impressed her that she converted to orthodox Christianity. All agree, however, that the conditions she set for any truce with Rome, was this monk's appointment as bishop over her people.

Details of the revolt
It was in the spring of 378 CE that Mavia launched the massive revolt against the central government, often compared to that launched by Zenobia a century earlier. Her forces, which she often led personally, swept into Arabia and Palestine and reached the edges of Egypt, defeating the armies of Rome many times. Because she and the Tanukhids had left Aleppo to use the desert as their base, the Romans were left without a standing target upon which to inflict retribution. Mavia's highly mobile units, using classic guerilla warfare tactics, conducted numerous raids and frustrated Roman attempts to subdue the revolt.

Mavia and her forces proved themselves to be superior to Roman forces in open battle as well. A century of having fought alongside Roman forces meant that they were familiar with Roman tactics and easily defeated the forces of the Roman governor over Palestine and Phoenicia, the first to be sent in to crush the revolt. She gained favour among townspeople in the region, sympathetic to her cause as well, and it seemed as though the whole Roman East would break away to be ruled by Mavia and her Arabs.  
 
A second force, led by the Roman military commander of the East himself, was sent out to meet Mavia's forces in open battle. Personally leading her forces into battle, Mavia proved to be not only an able political leader but also a strong field tactician. Her forces, using a mixture of Roman and native fighting tactics, often employed highly mobile lancers with devastating effect. The Romans were defeated, and unlike in their war against Zenobia, had few native allies to call upon, as one of their most valuable regional ally, the Tanukh, was the very group fighting them. Valens had no choice but to sue for peace.

As recorded by church historians

Church historians record Mavia's exploits, focusing in particular on the condition she set for the truce she procured from the Romans, which is considered to be important to early Christian evangelical efforts in the Levant. For example, Rufinus writes, Mavia, queen of the Saracens, had begun to convulse the villages and towns on the border of Palestine and Arabia with a violent war and to ravage the neighboring provinces. After she had worn down the Roman army in several battles, had felled a great many, and had put the remainder to flight, she was asked to make peace, which she did on the condition already declared: that a certain monk Moses be ordained bishop for her people.

Socrates of Constantinople writes of these same events, and notes that Moses, "a Saracen by birth, who led a monastic life in the desert" had become "exceedingly eminent for his piety, faith and miracles." He suggested that Mavia was "therefore desirous that this person should be constituted bishop over her nation, and promised on this condition to terminate the war." Mavia's firm commitment to the truce, as exemplified in her marrying her daughter to Victor, the commander-in-chief of the Roman army, is also noted by Socrates.

Sozomen provides even more detail on Mavia, referred to in his text as Mania, describing her rule, and the history of her people, whom he calls "Saracens". He writes that they are Ishmaelites, descended from the son of Hagar, Abraham's concubine, and that they name their children after Sarah, so as not to be regarded as sons of Hagar, and therefore as slaves. Of battle with "Mania, who commanded her own troops in person," Sozomen writes that it was considered "arduous" and "perilous", and that the general of the entire cavalry and infantry of the East had to be "rescued with difficulty" from battle against her and her troops by the general of the troops of Palestine and Phoenicia.

Aftermath
Moses was appointed the first Arab bishop of the Arabs, and an incipient Arab church began to emerge in the Roman East, attracting many Tanukh from Mesopotamia. Mavia also managed to regain the Tanukh's allied status and the privileges they enjoyed prior to Julian's reign. At the war's conclusion, Mavia's daughter, Princess Khasidat, was married to a devout Nicene commander in Rome's army, Victor, to cement the alliance. It was thus that Mavia brought the Arabs a just peace; however, it did not last long.

As part of the truce agreement, Mavia sent her forces to Thrace to help the Romans fight the Goths. Her forces proved less effective outside of their native territory and the Goths pushed the Romans back to Constantinople, even killing Valens, the emperor, in the process. Mavia's forces returned home, badly bruised and depleted in number. The new emperor, Theodosius I, favored the Goths, giving them many positions within the Roman establishment, at the expense of the Arabs. After having demonstrated their loyalty to Rome, the Arabs felt increasingly betrayed and mounted another revolt in 383 CE. This revolt was quickly put down and the Tanukh-Roman alliance ended for good, as Rome courted another Arab tribe, the Salih.

It is not known whether Mavia commanded this second revolt or not as there is no mention of its leadership. It is known that she died in Anasartha, east of Aleppo in the heart of the Tanukh tribal territory, where there is an inscription recording her death there in 425 CE.

Comparisons with Zenobia
More recent scholarship has approached Mavia within the context of the history of Arab warrior queens who preceded her, most prominent among them, Zenobia. For example, Irfan Shahid notes that the armies of both queens reached the same waterway dividing Asia from Europe, with Mavia even crossing the Bosporus into Byzantium. Noting the absence of any mention of Mavia in the work of Zosimus, who was familiar with the writings of Sozomen and Socrates, Shahid concludes this omission is deliberate since it did not accord with Zosimus' thesis regarding the destructive effects of the Christianization and barbarization he associated with Constantine I's reforms. Shahid writes that, "The contrast between the careers of the two Arab queens – the first belonging to the world of the third century, pagan and disloyal to Rome, the second belonging to the new world of the fourth century, Christian and loyal – would have been attributed only to the success of the Constantinian experiment."

See also
Cleopatra VII  
Veleda
Hypsicratea
Arab queens

References

Bibliography

Year of birth unknown
425 deaths
4th-century Arabs
4th-century monarchs in Asia
4th-century women rulers
5th-century Arabs
5th-century monarchs in Asia
5th-century women rulers
Ancient queens regnant
Arab queens
Arabs in the Roman Empire
Bedouin tribal chiefs
Converts to Christianity from pagan religions
Queens of Syria
Syrian Christians
Tanukhids
Women in 4th-century warfare
Women in ancient Near Eastern warfare